Quezon, officially the Municipality of Quezon,  is a 5th class municipality in the province of the same name. According to the 2020 census, it has a population of 15,886 people.

The municipality was named after Manuel L. Quezon, the second President of the Philippines, first President of the Philippine Commonwealth, and the former governor. It is home to the recently started Yubakan Festival and a few speakers of the critically endangered Inagta Alabat language, one of the most endangered languages in the world as listed by UNESCO.

Geography

Barangays
Quezon is politically subdivided into 24 barangays, 6 urban and 18 rural.

Climate

Demographics

Economy

References

External links
Quezon Profile at PhilAtlas.com
[ Philippine Standard Geographic Code]
Philippine Census Information
Local Governance Performance Management System

Municipalities of Quezon